George Field (March 18, 1877 – March 9, 1925) was an American silent film actor.

Early life
Born George Blankman Field to George Durgin Field and Elizabeth Blankman. Elizabeth was the daughter of dentist and attorney Dr. Henry Gerrit Blankman, born 3 May 1813 in Amsterdam, North Holland. He came to San Francisco from New York in June 1849. Elizabeth's mother was Magdelena del Valle, the niece and ward of the famous Mexican General Mariano de Vallejo and his brother Jose de Jesus de Vallejo.

Career
George began his career as a stage actor in the popular San Francisco theatre scene but was signed into film in 1912 and starred in 207 films until 1924. He also had a bit part in "Don Q Son of Zorro", where he was named as George Blankman. George and Winifred Greenwood worked at Flying A Studios in Santa Barbara. George later worked for Dustin Farnum, after whom Dustin Hoffman was named. 
George also starred with Charlotte Burton in films such as In the Firelight.

Personal life
He was married to his co-star Winifred L. Greenwood who herself starred in at least 222 films. They married in 1913 and were perhaps divorced in 1918.
However, illness cut his career short and he was forced to leave acting in late 1924. He died the following 9 March. after a battle with tuberculosis. He died aged 47. George's funeral notice appeared in The Los Angeles Times and stated that he was the beloved husband of Mary L. Field, so his divorce from Winifred is almost certain.

Selected filmography

 In the Firelight (1913)
 The Shriner's Daughter (1913)
 The Flirt and the Bandit (1913)
 While There's Life (1913)
 When a Woman Waits (1914)
 In Tune (1914)
 The Beggar Child (1914)
 The Archeologist (1914)
 A Slice of Life (1914)
 The Final Impulse (1914)
 The Redemption of a Pal (1914)
 The Wrong Birds (1914)
 The Song of the Sea Shell (1914)
 This Is th' Life (1914)
 The Butterfly (1914)
 The Lure of the Sawdust (1914)
 Mein Lieber Katrina (1914)
 Footprints of Mozart (1914)
 A Soul Astray (1914)
 Calamity Anne's Love Affair (1914)
 The Town of Nazareth (1914)
 Unto the Weak (1914)
 The Resolve (1915)
 The Diamond from the Sky (1915)
 Wife Wanted (1915)
 The Fate of the Dolphin (1916)
 Riddle Gawne (1918)
 The Light of Western Stars (1918)
 The Testing of Mildred Vane (1918)
 Inside the Lines (1918)
 The End of the Game (1919)
 The Tiger's Trail (1919)
 A White Man's Chance (1919)
 The Fighting Line (1919)
 The Gray Wolf's Ghost (1919)
 The Kid and the Cowboy (1919)
 A Sagebrush Hamlet (1919)
 The Moon Riders (1920)
 His Nose in the Book (1920)
 The Rattler's Hiss (1920)
 Held Up for the Makin's (1920)
 Hair Trigger Stuff (1920)
 The Prospector's Vengeance (1920)
 Diamonds Adrift (1921)
 Blood and Sand (1922)
 North of the Rio Grande (1922)
 Adam's Rib (1923)
 Trigger Fingers (1924)

External links

 

1877 births
1925 deaths
American male film actors
American male silent film actors
20th-century deaths from tuberculosis
Male actors from San Francisco
20th-century American male actors
Tuberculosis deaths in California